

Friedrich Siebert (7 July 1888 – 13 May 1950) was a general in the Wehrmacht of Nazi Germany who commanded the XIII Corps during World War II. He was a recipient of the Knight's Cross of the Iron Cross.  Siebert was a member of the Nazi Party.

Awards and decorations
 Iron Cross (1914)
 2nd Class
 1st Class
 Iron Cross (1939)
 2nd Class
 1st Class
 German Cross in Gold (13 May 1944) 
 Knight's Cross of the Iron Cross on 18 November 1941 as Generalleutnant and commander of 44. Infanterie Division

References

Citations

Bibliography

 

1888 births
1950 deaths
German Army generals of World War II
Generals of Infantry (Wehrmacht)
German Army personnel of World War I
Recipients of the clasp to the Iron Cross, 1st class
Recipients of the Gold German Cross
Recipients of the Knight's Cross of the Iron Cross
People from Ludwigshafen
People from the Palatinate (region)
Nazi Party members
Reichswehr personnel
Military personnel from Rhineland-Palatinate